What Kind of Man may refer to:
"What Kind of Man" (Joel Feeney song)
"What Kind of Man" (Florence and the Machine song)